Rosey can refer to:

People
 Roosevelt Rosey Brown (1932-2004), American National Football League player
 Sam Dolan (1884–1944), American college football player and coach
 Rosey Edeh (born 1966), Canadian television personality
 Gabrielle Rose Rosey Fletcher (born 1975), American Olympic snowboarder
 Roosevelt Rosey Grier (born 1932), American National Football League player, actor and minister
 Rosey E. Pool (1905-1971), Dutch writer, poet, educator and translator
 William Rosenbaum (1889-1949), American politician
 Albert Rosey Rowswell (1884-1955), American Major League Baseball radio sportscaster
 Roosevelt Taylor (born 1937), American former National Football League player
 Rosey (wrestler) (1970–2017), WWE ring name of professional wrestler Matthew Anoa'i

Other uses
 Institut Le Rosey, prestigious international boarding school in Switzerland
 Rosey Concert Hall
 Rosey, Haute-Saône, commune of the Haute-Saône département in France
 Rosey, Saône-et-Loire, commune of the Saône-et-Loire département in France
 "Rosey 105", a former branding of American radio station KRSK

See also
 Rosie (disambiguation)
 Rosy (disambiguation)

Lists of people by nickname